Masood Dakik (Farsi: جلالت محاب سید سلطان مسعود دقیق, born 19 August 1967) is an Afghan Muhammadzai prince, diplomat and State development specialist.

Early life 

Masood Dakik is a member of the Dakik cadet branch of the Afghan Royal Family. He traces his lineage back to Muhammad and Ali ibn Abi Talib through leading saints including Sayyid Mir Hasan, Hazrat Ishaan, Bahauddin Naqshband, Abdul Qadir Gilani and Hasan al Askari.

During the Saur Revolution 1978 executions of Afghan royals were carried out, including all ministers, generals and diplomats of the former government. President Hafizullah Amin however saved the life of his former professor Abdul Khaliq Khan, who acted as a freshly appointed minister under his cousin Prince Daoud Khan. This amnesty gave Prince Abdul Khaliq's son the young Prince Masood Dakik the chance to absolve his high school education in year 1984 at the francophonic elite school Lycée Istiqlal.

Escape from Afghanistan 
Once Sultan Masood Dakik was admitted to Kabul Medical School, his father Prince Abdul Khaliq had been imprisoned by President Babark Karmal, who feared an uprising of Prince Abdul Khaliq, which was the reason why Masood Dakik had to flee alongside his mother 7 days by foot to Pakistan. From there they were evacuated to Western Germany. It was on the occasion of this experience that Masood Dakik would later in Germany support refugees in a high intensity.

New life in Germany  
In Western Germany Dakik started his life by taking care of his mother as well as other family members in need and maintaining his family's royal heritage, working as a young management professional and senior executive in various industries. He logistically supported the Afghan people in the struggle against the Soviet Union and was deeply involved in humanitarian aid projects in his country Afghanistan as well as various African countries including Tanzania, Nigeria and Uganda. He eventually adopted 49 children and took care of them by providing long term assistance to them in the form of establishing habitat, granting education and initiating career empowerment. He also strongly committed himself to the alphabetization and education for Afghan women.

Achievements in sports

Judo 
Due to his passion for judo, he became member of the state cadre of Niedersachsen State and the Federal Cadre of Germany in the 1980s. He also won international judo championships, making him one of the most distinguished judokas of Europe with a commitments in British Columbia.

Sport shooting 
In his later ages Dakik focused on sport shooting, becoming the champion of a European sport shooting competition called the Summer Edition Cup in which various European Olympic Teams have participated in. Dakik is thus recognized as a leading sport shooter in Europe.

Cultural commitments 
As an intellectual person with a significant interest in arts and cultures, he studied arts extensively in the 1990s. For the purpose of specialization in the field of Islamic mystics and arts, he decided to continue his studies autodidactically by travelling around and negotiating with experts of his time. Notable cultural works of his were projects that consisted of renovations of historical sites in Pakistan, reviving Mughal and Naqshbandi Sufi history in Punjab, Pakistan. He also created his own calligraphical style from his studies of the calligraphic style of his direct ancestor Ali ibn Abi Talib. It was also in light of his respect for his relative the Islamic mystic Ali Hamadani, that he has established businesses in the textile industrial sector, for Hamadani is regarded as the father of Islam and textile production in Kashmir.

Focus on the development sector 
After his mother Princess Rahima Dakik passed away in year 2006, he pursued his career as a project manager specialized in the field of oil and gas and renewable energy economy with a significant presence in the sector of diplomatic rapprochement between the Western and Middle-Eastern Society. His rapprochement included know-how transfer and business cooperations like joint venture establishments. He also acted as an accredited diplomat for countries in the field of development and consulted various legislative procedures worldwide. He maintains a strong network in Western Republican as well as Middle Eastern Royal Societies. He leads the Alliance of International Aid, an international NGO with notable statesmen and diplomats like former Belgian Prime Minister Yves Leterme and US Congressman Mark Siljander as members of the advisory board.

Humanitarian aid in Afghanistan 
Dakik is an expert in development aid with a focus on renewable energy as well as basic philanthropy initiatives. With the back up of the German Foreign Ministry he travelled to Afghanistan in order to thematize humanitarian aid and potential development in light of the humanitarian crisis of 2021. He held constructive talks on aid, development and rapprochement with the Afghan deputy prime minister Abdul Ghani Baradar as well as the cabinet of the Islamic Emirate of Afghanistan. Other fields of development included rapprochement between the West and the Middle East in the sectors of renewable energy as well as combatting climate change.

Technocratic efforts 
One particular field of combatting carbon gas emissions is his emphasis on green oil and gas solutions, cooperating with various universities like the University of Hohenheim, the EPFL or Cranfield University as a leading technocrat in research and development.

Order of Merit of Germany 
In year 2015 he was in light of his social commitments nominated by the former Governor of Northrhine-Westphalia Hannelore Kraft and a judge in Düsseldorf to receive the Federal Cross of Merit. This nomination was granted by President Joachim Gauck.

Recognition 
In light of the hardships he had to bear because of the Soviet Invasion in Afghanistan and his immense influences and contributions, European royals and nobles respect Masood Dakik as an Afghan Royal by merit and de facto head of the Barakzai legacy.

Personal life 
In year 1996 he married his cousin Princess Nargis Dakik, who is also a descendant of Muhammad from the family of Sayyid Mir Jan. They have three children:

 Prince Raphael Dakik, International Lawyer and Technocrat (Engineering Specialist)
 Prince Matin Dakik, State Economy Specialist
 Prince Hamid Dakik, Project Engineering Specialist

Heritage of Sayyid Mir Jan  
Masood Dakik and his family are respected as family members of Sayyid Mir Jan, a leading Muslim saint considered as hereditary successor of Muhammad by Sunni Muslims worldwide adhering to the Cultural Heritage of Sayyid Mir Jan with a significant fellowship in Pakistan.

Honors

State honors 
  Member of the Order of Merit of the Federal Republic of Germany

Sport Awards 
 Member of the State Cadre of Lower Saxony State
 Member of the Federal German Judo Cadre
 Champion of the Summer Edition Shooting Cup 2012

Hereditary titles 
 Sardar (Sovereign Prince of Afghanistan)
 His Royal Highness (Jalalat Mahab)
 Sultan ("Higher Prine"(Above Sardar but under Shah), appointed by King Zahir Shah under the nomination of Shah Mahmud Khan's son Sultan Mahmud Ghazi)
 Sayyid ul Sadaat (As member of the Sayyid ul Sadaat Clan)

Bloodline to Prophet Muhammad 

Prophet Muhammad (s)
Bibi Fatimah (r.a.) and Sayyidina Ali (k.w.)
Imam Hussein
Imam Ali al-Zayn ul Abideen (marryied Sayyida Fatima bint Hasan ibn Ali)
Imam Muhammad al-Baqir al Hasani wal Husseini
Imam Jafar al-Sadiq (his mother is the great granddaughter of Sayyidina Abu Bakr)
Imam Musa al-Kazim
Sayyid ul Sadaat Abu Qasim Sayyid Mir Hamza
Sayyid ul Sadaat Sayyid Mir Qasim
Sayyid ul Sadaat Sayyid Mir Ahmad
Sayyid ul Sadaat Sayyid Mir Muhammad
Sayyid ul Sadaat Khwaja Sayyid Mir Ismail Muhammad Hakim
Sayyid ul Sadaat Khwaja Sayyid Mir Latif
Sayyid ul Sadaat Khwaja Sayyid Mir Muhammad
Sayyid ul Sadaat Khwaja Sayyid Mir Kulal
Sayyid ul Sadaat Khwaja Sayyid Mir Ahmad
Sayyid ul Sadaat Khwaja Sayyid Mir Hashim
Sayyid ul Sadaat Khwaja Sayyid Mir Mastali
Sayyid ul Sadaat Khwaja Sayyid Mir Dostali
Sayyid ul Sadaat Khwaja Sayyid Mir Muhammad Latif
Sayyid ul Sadaat Khwaja Sayyid Mir Abdullah
Sayyid ul Sadaat Khwaja Sayyid Mir Muhammad Shamah
Sayyid ul Sadaat Khwaja Sayyid Mir Latifullah
Sayyid ul Sadaat Khwaja Sayyid Mir Ruhollah
Sayyid ul Sadaat Khwaja Sayyid Mir Baitullah
Sayyid ul Sadaat Khwaja Sayyid Mir Nimatullah
Sayyid ul Sadaat Khwaja Sayyid Mir Azimullah
Sayyid ul Sadaat Sayyid Mir Hassan bin Azimullah (marrying H.I.H. Princess Siddiqa al Kubra a descendant of Hazrat Ishaan, Bahauddin Naqshband and Abdul Qadir Gilani)
H.H. Chief Justice Sayyid ul Sadaat Sayyid Mir Fazlullah Agha (Chief Justice of the Emirate of Afghanistan and brother of H.H. Sayyid Mir Jan and Sayyid Mahmud Agha)
H.H. Sayyid ul Sadaat Sayyid Mir Muhammad Jan bin Mir Fazlullah
H.H. Sayyidat al Sadaat Sayyida Bibi Rahima Begum (marrying H.R.H. Prof. Dr. Abdul Khaliq Telai of the Barakzai dynasty)
HRH Sayyid Sultan Masood(marrying his maternal cousin HH Sayyida Nargis daughter of Sayyid Mir Assadullah son of Sayyid Mir Muhammad Jan son of Mir Fazlullah)

Children of Sultan Masood Dakik:

Prince Sayyid Raphael Dakik, Lawyer and Technocrat
Prince Sayyid Matin Dakik, State Economy Specialist
Prince Sayyid Hamid Dakik, Project Engineering Specialist

See also 
Sayyid Moinuddin Hadi Naqshband
Sultan Mohammed Khan Telai
Sport Shooting

References 

German philanthropists
1967 births
Living people
Barakzai dynasty
Quran reciters
People from Kabul
German male judoka
Male judoka
Male sport shooters
Afghan princes
Pashtun people
Afghan emigrants to Germany
20th-century Afghan people
21st-century Afghan people
Recipients of the Order of Merit of the Federal Republic of Germany
20th-century imams
21st-century imams
20th-century Islamic religious leaders
21st-century Islamic religious leaders
20th-century Muslim scholars of Islam
21st-century Muslim scholars of Islam
Sportsmen
German people of Afghan descent
German people of Arab descent